Donghe Township is a rural township located in northeastern Taitung County, Taiwan. The population is mainly the indigenous Amis people. The main industry is agriculture.

History
Donghe Township has an old name of Fafokod (馬武窟), which means "fishing by net" in the Ami language. Many of its prehistory artifacts is found at Dulan Site.

Under Qing dynasty rule, the township was under the jurisdiction of the Pi-lam Subprefecture (卑南廳) and "Taitung direct-controlled state" (臺東直隸州) jurisdiction.

In 1920, during the period of Japanese rule, the Toran local office (都蘭區役場) was set up. In 1937, it was changed to Toran Village (都蘭庄), under Shinkō District (新港郡), Taitō Prefecture. The name "Donghe Township" was established after World War II and is currently used.

Geography
It is bounded on the northeast  by Chenggong, east by Pacific Ocean, west by neighboring Chihshang Township, Guanshan Township, and Luye Township, and south by Beinan Township.

This township is located on the east side of coastal mountain range. It includes 60% of the hillside onshore, divided into coastal and basin areas with gradual upland slopes merging into relatively flat sea stage plains, the area of major development. Basin streams are mainly north-south because of the difficult terrain. Climate is tropical monsoon climate.

Administrative divisions
 Beiyuan Village
Doulan Village
 Longchang Village
 Shangde Village
 Taiyuan Village
 Tunghe Village
 Xingchang Village

Education

Junior high schools
Taitung County Dulan Junior High School

Elementary schools
Donghe Elementary School, Dongher Township, Taiwan East County
Dulan Elementary School, Donghe Township, Taitung County
Sinlong School,Donghe Township, Taitung County
Taiyuan Elementary School, Donghe Township, Taitung County

Tourist attractions

 Dulan Mountain
 Dulan Site
 Jinzun Fish Port
 Old Donghe Bridge

Transportation
 Provincial Highway 11
 Provincial Highway 23

Notable natives
 Van Fan, singer and actor

References

Townships in Taitung County